Chaerocina jordani is a moth of the family Sphingidae. It is known from the highlands of Ethiopia.

The length of the forewings is 37–38 mm. The head and body are bright deep green. The sides of the thorax are whitish pink. The forewings are deep green with four regular darker green transverse lines, a large black stigma and a black streak at the apex. The inner margin is pink. The hindwings are blackish with a large green spot at the margin, near the tornus. The underside is red at the base and ochreous speckled with black elsewhere.

References

Endemic fauna of Ethiopia
Chaerocina
Moths described in 1938
Moths of Africa